The 17th Guards Rifle Division was created on March 17, 1942, from the first formation of the 119th Rifle Division, in recognition of that division's stalwart defense against German Army Group Center in the Battle of Moscow, and in the subsequent strategic offensive that threw the German forces back from the capital. The 17th Guards continued a record of distinguished service through the rest of the Great Patriotic War. It became the 123rd Guards Motor Rifle Division in 1957 and converted into the 129th Guards Machine-Gun Artillery Division in 1989. In 2001, it was converted to the 17th Guards Motor Rifle Division and became the 70th Guards Motor Rifle Brigade in 2009. The brigade is currently based in Ussuriysk.

Formation 
The 17th Guards was one of four Guards rifle divisions created in Kalinin Front on the same date (along with 20th, 21st and 22nd Guards) in recognition of their role in driving in the left flank of Army Group Center during the winter of 1941–42. When formed, its order of battle was as follows:
 45th Guards Rifle Regiment from 421th Rifle Regiment
 48th Guards Rifle Regiment from 634st Rifle Regiment
 52nd Guards Rifle Regiment from 920th Rifle Regiment
 26th Guards Artillery Regiment from 349th Artillery Regiment
 22nd Guards Antitank Battalion from 230th Antitank Battalion
 16th Guards Sapper Battalion from 224th Sapper Battalion.
The division was part of 22nd Army when it was formed, and remained in Kalinin Front, in either that army or the 41st Army for the next year. In early 1943 it was transferred to 5th Guards Rifle Corps in 39th Army, and remained under those commands for the duration.

In late 1943 the division, along with the rest of 39th Army, was transferred to Western Front, and took part in the campaign to liberate Smolensk. The division was the first Soviet unit to enter the city of  Dukhovshchina after it was abandoned by German XXVII Army Corps on the night of September 16/17 and received its name as an honorific.

During Operation Bagration the 17th Guards, now under 3rd Belorussian Front, advanced into the southern Baltic States. At the time of the German surrender the division was in East Prussia, near Königsberg. In the following months the entire 39th Army was shipped east across Siberia, and in August 1945, participated in the invasion of Japanese-occupied Manchuria as part of Transbaikal Front. By this time its towed anti-tank battalion had been replaced with a battalion of SU-76 self-propelled guns, but the divisional artillery had not been augmented as per the December 1944, Guards Rifle Division table of organization. During this campaign the division received a second honorific, Khinganskaya, for its efforts in driving through the Khingan Range.

When the war ended the division honorifics were – Russian: Духовщинско-Хинганская Краснознамённая ордена Суворова дивизия (English: Dukhovshchina, Khingan, Order of the Red Banner, Order of Suvorov), and five of its men had been named as Heroes of the Soviet Union.

Postwar 
Postwar, the division moved to Barabash, Primorsky Krai with the 39th Army from Port Arthur. The 39th Army disbanded in 1956 and the division became part of the 5th Army. On 17 May 1957, it became the 123rd Guards Motor Rifle Division. On 19 February 1962, the 319th Separate Equipment Maintenance and Recovery Battalion was activated. In May 1962, the 111th Separate Tank Battalion was formed. On 22 February 1968, the division was awarded the Order of the October Revolution. On 15 November 1972, the 392nd Separate Anti-Tank Artillery Battalion was activated. In 1980, the 1135th Separate Material Supply Battalion formed from the motor transport battalion. In 1989, the 111th Separate Tank Battalion disbanded.

On 1 October 1989, it became the 129th Guards Machine-Gun Artillery Division. The 45th Guards Motor Rifle Regiment disbanded and was replaced by the 290th Machine-Gun Artillery Regiment, the former 20th Fortified Area. The 52nd Guards Motor Rifle Regiment was disbanded and replaced by the 196th Machine-Gun Artillery Regiment, the former 4th Fortified Area. The 1170th Anti-Aircraft Artillery Regiment was disbanded and replaced by the 1133rd Anti-Aircraft Missile Regiment. The 48th Guards Motor Rifle Regiment and 1133rd Anti-Aircraft Missile Regiment transferred to the 40th Motor Rifle Division for Coastal Defence in October 1990. That division's 231st Motor Rifle Regiment and 1173rd Anti-Aircraft Missile Regiment became part of the 129th Guards Division. In September 2001, the division was converted into the 17th Guards Motor Rifle Division. In June 2009, it was downsized into the 70th Separate Guards Motor Rifle Brigade.

The brigade relocated to Ussuriysk in 2012, taking over the barracks of the former Ussuriysk Higher Military Automotive Command School of the Automotive Troops, disbanded in June 2007.

Since 2018, the 70th Brigade may have become the 114th Guards Motor Rifle Regiment of the 127th Motor Rifle Division.

References 

 

G017